Milan Marković (born 7 September 1970) is a Serbian lawyer, professor and politician. He served as the Minister of Public Administration and Local Self-Government from 2007 to 2011 and as the Minister of Human and Minority Rights, Public Administration and Local Self-Government from 2011 to 2012.

He was president of the Palilula municipality from 2000 to 2004. He has been an MP in Serbian Parliament since 2001. From 2003 to 2007 he was deputy speaker in Serbian parliament. He was member of managing boards in PKB and Prva Petoletka companies. He was the Belgrade mayor deputy from 2000 until 2004.

He teaches at the University of Belgrade Faculty of Security Studies and is a graduate of the University of Belgrade's Law School.

He left the Democratic Party in 2012.

References

External links

1970 births
Living people
Politicians from Belgrade
Government ministers of Serbia
Democratic Party (Serbia) politicians
Academic staff of the University of Belgrade
University of Belgrade Faculty of Law alumni